Default is a 2014 American action thriller film directed by Simón Brand and featuring David Oyelowo.

Cast
Greg Callahan as Saltzman
Katherine Moennig as Juliana
Stephen Lord as Kane
Connor Fox as Pete Bowers
Jeanine Mason as Marcela
Peres Owino as Nadifa Sabisi
David Oyelowo as Atlas
Benjamin Ochieng as Edward
James C. Victor as Finley
Harbi Mohameud as Skinny
Hakeemshady Mohamed as Blue Eyes
Karim Ndiaye as Leo

Reception
The film has a 33% rating on Rotten Tomatoes.

References

External links
 
 

2014 films
American action thriller films
2010s English-language films
2010s American films